Sukeyuki (written: 祐亨) is a masculine Japanese given name. Notable people with the name include:

, Japanese mayor
, Imperial Japanese Navy admiral

Japanese masculine given names